Barrett Martineau (born September 4, 1991) is a Canadian Olympic skeleton racer who has competed since 2010. He was the Canadian Champion in both the 2016/2017 and 2017/2018 seasons. Barrett competed for Canada at the 2018 Winter Olympic Games in PyeongChang South Korea. In 2016-17, he finished 13th in the overall ranking. He competed for the top of the World Cup overall ranking. He then finished 13th at the 2017 IBSF World Championships. He also won 7 America Cups and 3 Canadian National Titles.

References

External links
 
 Full career results
 
 

1991 births
Canadian male skeleton racers
Living people
Sportspeople from Calgary
Skeleton racers at the 2018 Winter Olympics
Olympic skeleton racers of Canada
20th-century Canadian people
21st-century Canadian people